Massimo Scaglione (19 September 1931 – 8 October 2015) was an Italian television director, writer and politician.

Life and career 
Born in Garessio, Cuneo, Scaglione graduated in Modern Literature at the University of Turin. He was employed by RAI in 1955, and directed over 1,000 television programs, TV-movies, series and stage works. He wrote several essays on the history of the theater, directed a drama school, the "Centro di Formazione Teatro delle Dieci", and held theatre courses at the DAMS department of University of Turin.   He was among the founders of the right wing party Lega Nord Piemont and was elected senator for two legislatures.

He was married to the dancer Loredana Furno.

References

External links 
 

1931 births
2015 deaths
20th-century Italian historians
21st-century Italian writers
Italian television directors
Italian theatre directors
Italian male non-fiction writers
People from Garessio
Italian essayists
Historians of theatre
Lega Nord politicians
Members of the Senate of the Republic (Italy)
University of Turin alumni
Academic staff of the University of Turin
Male essayists